Dreams is a 2005 Indian romantic drama film directed by Ashish Chanana starring himself and Neha Pendse.

Plot
A touching portrayal of human emotions, Dreams is about Shekhar, a successful film director and Pooja, a simple small town girl who travels to Mumbai with nothing but a bag of dreams. The suave and rich Shekhar helps realize them for her.  "DREAMS" is an interesting narrative of the journey of being a 'nobody' to becoming a 'somebody'; a journey into the limelight where you realize there is no one who is truly yours - often the price associated with being a "star".

Cast    
 Aashish Chanana as Shekhar
 Neha Pendse as Pooja
 Arzoo Govitrikar as Simran
 Manoj Bidwai as Sameer
 Raju Kher as Pooja's Father

Music

Reception 
Film critic Subhash K. Jha gave the film a rating of one out of five stars and wrote that "Films about the heartbreaks of showbiz are always welcome. But not when they break your heart with a complete lack of vision and basic sensibleness in treatment".

References 

2005 films
2000s Hindi-language films
Indian romantic drama films
Films scored by Sajid–Wajid